Royce McKinney (born November 3, 1953) is a former American football defensive back. He played for the Buffalo Bills in 1975.

References

1953 births
Living people
American football defensive backs
Kentucky State Thorobreds football players
Buffalo Bills players